Audet is a municipality in the Le Granit Regional County Municipality in the Estrie region of Quebec, Canada. Population is 734 as of the Canada 2016 Census.

Although the post office has been known as Audet since 1894, named after Michel Audet, the first postmaster, the municipality was known as Saint-Hubert-de-Spaulding until 1959, referring to the township of Spaulding, in which it is located.

Sources

Municipalities in Quebec
Incorporated places in Estrie
Le Granit Regional County Municipality